Renhe is a town in Xiajiang County, Ji'an, Jiangxi, China.

References

Xiajiang County
Township-level divisions of Jiangxi